Banteay Srei (literally "Women's Fortress") is a district located in Siem Reap province, in north-west Cambodia. The temple of Banteay Srei is also located within the district. According to the 1998 census of Cambodia, it had a population of 32,271.

Administrative divisions

References

http://db.ncdd.gov.kh/gazetteer/view/index.castle

Districts of Cambodia
Geography of Siem Reap province